The New Mexico Activities Association (NMAA) is a nonprofit organization that regulates interscholastic programs for junior and senior high schools in New Mexico. It hosts the statewide sports championship games each year.

History

NMAA was organized in 1921 by John Milne, James Bickley, F. H. Lynn, and J. D.
Shinkle as the New Mexico High School Athletic Association. In 1953 it began adding non-athletic activities and changed its name to New Mexico High School Activities Association. It continued to broaden its coverage and in 1961 changed its name to the present New Mexico Activities Association. The Hall of Pride and Honor was opened in 1992.

Scope, membership, and governance

NMAA was incorporated as a New Mexico nonprofit corporation in 1964. 
In 1997 there was a major restructuring, with the Board of Directors replacing the Executive Committee as the governing body.
The present Executive Director, Sally Marquez, took office in 2012.

Even though NMAA is a private organization, it is regulated to some extent by the State of New Mexico. New Mexico law (NMSA 1978 22-2-2L) gives the Public Education Department authority over "an association or organization attempting to regulate a public school activity", giving it authority to approve or disapprove rules and to require performance and financial audits, and requiring the organizations to comply with New Mexico's Open Meetings Act and its Public Records Act.

Membership in NMAA is open to public, private and parochial middle/junior high and senior high schools in New Mexico.
As of late 2008, NMAA had 187 member middle schools and junior high schools
and 163 member high schools.
A list of member high schools is available.

NMAA is a member of the National Federation of State High School Associations.

Total revenue for the year ending June 30, 2007 was $3,961,100.
NMAA claims to be a national leader in corporate development (that is, attracting sponsorships). In 1998 NMAA was reported to have multi-year sponsorship agreements with 50 firms, bringing in $100 to $35,000 per firm.
In 2007 NMAA was reported to have increased its sponsorship revenue from $27,000 to $700,000 over the past four years.
As of late 2008 the NMAA web site listed 31 corporate sponsors.

Sanctioned activities

NMAA-sanctioned athletics are:
Baseball, Basketball, Cross Country, Football, Golf, Soccer, Softball, Swimming & Diving, Tennis, Track and Field, Volleyball, Wrestling, Spirit (Cheerleading and Drill Team), 

NMAA-sanctioned non-athletic activities are:
Athletic Training Challenge, Bowling, Business Professionals of America, Chess, Choir, Concert Band, DECA Marketing Education, Drama / One Act Play, English Expo, Family, Career, and Community Leaders of America, FFA Agriculture Education, Health Occupations Students of America, Junior Reserve Officers' Training Corps, Mock Trial, Rodeo, Scholastic Publications, Science Fair, Science Olympiad, SkillsUSA, Speech and Debate, Student Council, Technology Student Association. Not all of these are competitive.

Athletic alignment and classification

The NMAA divides school sports into classes by geographic location ("District") and by enrollment ("Class"). An example is 5-3A, meaning District 5 and Class AAA. The number of districts varies by sport. A school may choose to compete in a higher class than its enrollment would indicate.
Thus, a particular school may be in different districts and classes in different sports. For example, in 2008 Albuquerque Academy is in District 5-4A for most sports, but is in District 4-3A for football.
Menaul School is in District 6-1A in most sports, District 1-8M (an eight-man division) in football, and District 1-1A/3A in golf (which combines the 1A, 2A and 3A classes).
A complete listing of alignment and classification is available.
In December 2008 NMAA issued a proposed revised schedule of alignment and classification.

Awards and honors

The NMAA Hall of Pride and Honor is located in the NMAA building in Albuquerque. It includes the NMAA Hall of Fame, the New Mexico High School Coaches Association Hall of Honor, the New Mexico Officials Association Hall of Fame, and a hall of the persons from New Mexico who have been inducted in the National Federation of State High School Associations Hall of Fame.

The NMAA Foundation was founded in 2007. It raises funds and awards scholarships to individuals and grants to school programs in the activities sanctioned by NMAA.

State championships

NMAA hosts the tournaments that determine the statewide champions in 13 different sports.

Past team state champions

Schools with most team titles

References

External links

Education in New Mexico
Sports in New Mexico
High school sports associations in the United States
Organizations based in Albuquerque, New Mexico
Sports organizations established in 1921
1921 establishments in New Mexico